HMS Grindall (K477) was a British Captain-class frigate of the Royal Navy in commission during World War II. Originally constructed as the United States Navy Evarts-class destroyer escort USS Sanders (DE-273), she served in the Royal Navy from 1943 to 1945 and then in the U.S. Navy as USS Grindall (DE-273) from August to October 1945.

Construction and transfer
The ship was ordered on 25 January 1942 as the U.S. Navy destroyer escort DE-273 and named USS Sanders on 23 February 1943, the first ship of the name after Ensign Eugene Thomas Sanders, who was killed in action aboard the battleship  during the Japanese attack on Pearl Harbor. She was laid down by the Boston Navy Yard in Boston, Massachusetts, on 23 April 1943 and launched on 4 June 1943, sponsored by Mrs. Eugene Thomas Sanders. The United States transferred the ship to the United Kingdom under Lend-Lease on 23 September 1943.

Service history

Royal Navy, 1943-1945
The ship was commissioned into service in the Royal Navy as HMS Grindall (K477) on 23 September 1943 simultaneously with her transfer. She served on patrol and escort duty. On 15 April 1945, she joined the British frigate  in a depth-charge attack that sank the German submarine U-285 in the North Atlantic Ocean southwest of Ireland at position .

The Royal Navy returned Grindall to the U.S. Navy on 20 August 1945 at Chatham Dockyard in England.

U.S. Navy, 1945
The ship was commissioned into the U.S. Navy as USS Grindall (DE-273) on 20 August 1945 simultaneously with her return.  She soon steamed to the Philadelphia Naval Shipyard in Philadelphia, Pennsylvania, where she remained until she was decommissioned on 19 October 1945.

Disposal
The U.S. Navy struck Grindall from its Naval Vessel Register on 1 November 1945 and scrapped her at the Philadelphia Naval Shipyard, where her scrapping was completed on 28 May 1946.

References

Navsource Online: Destroyer Escort Photo Archive Sanders (DE-273)/HMS Grindall (K.477)
uboat.net HMS Grindall (K 477)
Captain Class Frigate Association HMS Grindall K477 (DE 273)

External links
 Photo gallery of USS Sanders (DE-273) and HMS Grindall (K477)

 

Captain-class frigates
Evarts-class destroyer escorts
World War II frigates of the United Kingdom
World War II frigates and destroyer escorts of the United States
Ships built in Boston
1943 ships